Christian Ferdinand Schiess VC (7 April 1856 – 14 December 1884) was a Swiss recipient of the Victoria Cross, the highest and most prestigious award for gallantry in the face of the enemy that can be awarded to British and Commonwealth forces. He died in poverty at just 28.

Biography

Schiess was born in Burgdorf, Switzerland on 7 April 1856, and spent time in an orphanage after his parents died. In 1870 he joined the French Army and fought in the Franco-Prussian War. Schiess later served in the Armée de l'Est and thus was interned in his home country when it surrendered there. He went to South Africa in 1877 and volunteered for the last Xhosa War. When the Anglo-Zulu War began the 22-year-old veteran was made a corporal in the Natal Native Contingent of the British Army in South Africa.

On 22 January 1879, at Rorke's Drift, Natal, Corporal Schiess, in spite of suffering from bad blisters on his foot caused by ill fitting boots, displayed great gallantry when the garrison had retired to the inner line of defence and the Zulus had occupied the wall of mealie bags which had been abandoned. He crept along the wall in order to dislodge one of the enemy and succeeded in killing him and two others before returning to the inner defences.

In 1880 he was awarded the Victoria Cross by General Sir Garnet Wolseley for his services at Rorke's Drift. Schiess was the first man serving with a locally raised native unit to receive the Victoria Cross, the "British-only" rule being broken under political pressure, also being the first Swiss national to do so.

After the volunteer forces were disbanded he failed to find work, even from British authorities. He briefly went to India but eventually returned to South Africa. In 1884, he was found on the streets of Cape Town suffering from exposure and malnutrition. The Royal Navy found him, gave him food, and offered him a passage to England on board the Serapis. He accepted, but became ill during the voyage and died.

It is unknown if there was a portrait of Corporal Schiess. According to some, in Lady Butler's painting The Defence of Rorke's Drift he is shown lying at left against the mealie bags.

Victoria Cross
The citation for Schiess's Victoria Cross was given as:

His Victoria Cross is displayed at the National Army Museum.

Recognition in Switzerland
For many years, Schiess's story was almost unknown in his home country. However, in recent years he has been remembered by the Museum of the Swiss Abroad at the Château de Penthes in Geneva and by the Swiss branch of the Royal British Legion.

Film portrayal
In the 1964 film Zulu, Dickie Owen portrays Schiess as a much older soldier than he was during the Battle of Rorke's Drift.

References

Monuments to Courage (David Harvey, 1999)
The Register of the Victoria Cross (This England, 1997)

External links

Discussion that Schiess is depicted in Lady Elizabeth Butler's 1879 painting "The Defence of Rorke's Drift"

1856 births
1884 deaths
Anglo-Zulu War recipients of the Victoria Cross
British colonial army soldiers
British military personnel of the 9th Cape Frontier War
British Army personnel of the Anglo-Zulu War
Burials at sea
French military personnel of the Franco-Prussian War
People from Burgdorf, Switzerland
People who died at sea